Gille Coemgáin or Gillecomgan was the King or Mormaer of Moray, a semi-autonomous kingdom centred on Inverness that stretched across the north of Scotland. Unlike his two predecessors, he is not called King of Scotland in his death notice, but merely Mormaer. This has led to some speculation that he was never actually the ruler of Moray, but merely a subordinate of Mac Bethad mac Findláich. (Hudson p. 136).

In 1020, he participated in the killing of his uncle Findláech, the father of MacBeth. The Annals of Ulster (s.a. 1032) reports that Gille Coemgáin was burned to death, together with 50 of his men. The perpetrators are not mentioned in any sources. From circumstances, two candidates have been proposed to have led the atrocity: Malcolm II of Scotland or Mac Bethad, who then became the only ruler of Moray. Both men were Gille Coemgáin's cousin, and both had reason to want him dead.
Gille Coemgáin is believed to have killed his cousin Dúngal mac Cináeda, the younger brother of Malcolm II, in 999. This could be a motive, but 33 years is a long time to wait for retaliation. Likewise, Gille Coemgáin participated in the death of Mac Bethad's father, his death at Mac Bethad's hands may also have been an act of retaliation; however, this is not documented.  Mac Bethad gained more from Gille Coemgáin's death for not only did he become the solitary ruler of Moray, he also married Gruoch, Gille Coemgáin's widow. The marriage may have been either as a conquered enemy widow or a widow of an ally and kinsman, depending on who was responsible for the murder. Both scenarios are entirely credible, knowing archaic medieval customs – nothing exculpatory can be concluded from the marriage, whereas the adoption of the stepson may be a weightier indication.

Gille Coemgáin and Gruoch were the parents of Lulach, a future King of Scotland, fostered by Mac Bethad, whom he succeeded.

In fiction

In the animated series Gargoyles, Gille Coemgáin is referred to as Gillecomgain.  As a boy, Gille Coemgáin surprises Demona prowling around one night in his family's barn, and is promptly slashed in the face by the female gargoyle, creating the generational line of "hunters" bent on destroying all gargoyles. As an adult, just as in medieval reality, Gille Coemgáin kills his uncle Findlaech of Moray, here under the orders of Duncan I of Scotland.  Duncan rewards Gillecomgain by making him High Steward of Moray and marrying him to Gruoch.

Bibliography
 Hudson, Benjamin T., Kings of Celtic Scotland, (Westport, 1994)

References

For primary sources see also  External links below.

 Weir, Alison, "Britain's Royal Families: The Complete Genealogy"

External links
 Annals of Ulster
 Annals of Tigernach

1032 deaths
Gille Coemgain
People from Moray
11th-century Scottish monarchs
10th-century Scottish people
Year of birth unknown
Mormaers of Moray
11th-century mormaers